José Balaustre (born 16 July 1965) is a Venezuelan cyclist. He competed in the men's individual road race at the 1996 Summer Olympics.

References

External links
 

1965 births
Living people
Venezuelan male cyclists
Olympic cyclists of Venezuela
Cyclists at the 1996 Summer Olympics
Place of birth missing (living people)
20th-century Venezuelan people